Highway to Hell is a 1979 album by AC/DC.

Highway to Hell may also refer to:

 "Highway to Hell" (song), song by AC/DC from the 1979 album of the same name
 Stairway to Heaven/Highway to Hell, music tribute compilation
 Highway to Hell (film), 1992 film starring Chad Lowe and Kristy Swanson
 Ghost Rider: Highway to Hell
 D-32 (Michigan county highway), road colloquially referred to as the "Highway to Hell"

See also
 Hell's Highway (disambiguation)
 Highway Thru Hell, Canadian reality TV show
 Saskatchewan Highway 35, the "Highway from Hell"
 Road to Hell (disambiguation)